SRM Institute of Science and Technology (SRMIST), formerly SRM University, is a private higher education institute deemed to be university, located in Kattankulathur, Chengalpattu (near Chennai), Tamil Nadu, India. Founded in 1985 as SRM Engineering College in Kattankulathur, it gained the deemed status in 2002. SRM Institute of Science and Technology includes six campuses, four in Tamil Nadu — Kattankulathur, Ramapuram and Vadapalani, and Tiruchirappalli, one in Andhra Pradesh — Amaravati, and one in NCR Delhi.

History 
The first college of what is now SRMIST, SRM (Sri Ramaswamy Memorial) Engineering College, was established in 1985, followed by the other SRM colleges from 1992 to 1997. The institute gained deemed status in 2002 as SRM Institute of Science and Technology and renamed SRM University in 2006. In 2017, its name was reverted to SRM Institute of Science and Technology following UGC's request to drop "University" from the name.

Campuses

Kattankulathur campus
The main campus at Kattankulathur consists of a College of Engineering and Technology, College of Medicine and Health Sciences, College of Science and Humanities, School of Management and School of Law. It is also one of the few schools in India that offers a Degree in Telecom studies.

Kattankulathur Campus also houses the SRM Medical College Hospital and Research Center and the SRM Hotel. The SRM Hospital can accommodate 1200 in-patients with 25 specializations in PG education in medical science.

The campus also accommodates the SRM Institute of Hotel Management, SRM Arts and Science College, SRM Law College, SRM Management College, Valliammai Engineering College, and Valliammai Polytechnic College.

Ramapuram campus
The Ramapuram Campus of SRM Institute of Science and Technology is located at Ramapuram, Chennai. It houses three colleges, the Faculty of Engineering and Technology, SRM Dental College, and Easwari Engineering College. The campus also offers Bachelor of Architecture, Bachelor of Design, MBA, science & humanities, and dental courses.

Vadapalani campus
Vadapalani Campus is located at Vadapalani, Chennai. This campus houses the Faculty of Engineering and Technology, Faculty of Management Sciences, Faculty of MCA. The SRM Institute for Medical Sciences is also located within the campus.

Tiruchirappalli campus 
The  campus at Trichy on the Trichy-Chennai highway houses the faculties of Engineering & Technology, Science & Humanities, Allied Medical Science and Management.

NCR campus 
The  campus at Modinagar on Delhi-Meerut highway houses the faculties of Engineering & Technology, Management and Teacher Education.

Academics

Admissions
SRM Institute of Science and Technology conducts their own admission test known as the SRM Joint Engineering Entrance Examination (SRMJEEE). This exam is held every year in the month of April and can be taken only via the online mode of application. SRMJEEE 2020 was cancelled due to the ongoing pandemic situation and the admissions were based on Board exams.

The general paper pattern consists of four compulsory sections including English, Aptitude, Physics and Chemistry. The optional section consists of either Mathematics or Biology depending upon the course chosen during exam registration.

As of 2019, more than 170,000 students had appeared for the examination out of which 76,000 were called for counseling.

Rankings 

The QS World University Rankings ranked SRM Institute of Science and Technology 301–350 in Asia in 2020.

SRM Institute of Science and Technology ranked 29 among engineering colleges in India by India Today in 2020. The National Institutional Ranking Framework (NIRF) ranked it 24 in the engineering ranking in 2022, 12 in the pharmacy ranking, 19 among universities and 36 overall.

Notable alumni

 Anil Kumar Poluboina, Minister of Irrigation (Water Resources) for Andhra Pradesh 
 Niveda Thomas, actress
 Murali Vijay, cricketer
 Richards Johnkumar, Indian politician
 Vishnu Vishal, actor
 Iswarya Menon, film actress
 Neeraj Madhav, actor
 Amlan Das, actor
 Varun Chakravarthy, cricketer
 Kalaiyarasan, actor
 Arjun Kalyan, Indian Chess Grandmaster
 Aravinnd Singh, director of photography
 Abhay Jodhpurkar, singer
 Shebin Benson, actor
 Sam Anton, music director
 Sidharth Bharathan, film director
 K (composer), music director
 Nethra Kumanan, Olympic athlete
 Sanjana Sarathy, model and actress
 Nivas K. Prasanna, music director
 Pujita Ponnada, actress
 Rethika Srinivas
 Masha Nazeem
 Gayatri Jayaraman
 Utthara Unni, actor
 Halitha Shameem, Indian film director
 Athulya Ravi, film actress
 Deekshitha Manikkam, actress
 Manimegalai (VJ)
 GM Vishnu Prasanna, coach of Gukesh D

See also 
 SRM University, Andhra Pradesh

References

External links

 

Engineering colleges in Chennai
Universities and colleges in Kanchipuram district
All India Council for Technical Education
Deemed universities in Tamil Nadu
Academic institutions formerly affiliated with the University of Madras
Educational institutions established in 1985
1985 establishments in Tamil Nadu